Wanchaq District is one of eight districts of the province Cusco in Peru.  It includes Avenida de la Cultura, and Avenida de los Incas.  It is home to 2 hospitals, and borders the district of San Sebastian.

References